The Victorian Football Club, "The Victorians", renamed the North Adelaide Football Club for the 1883 season, was an Australian rules football club based in North Adelaide, South Australia.

History 

The Victorian Football Club first recorded game was against a team called Young Clubs on Saturday 13 June 1874. The game resulted in a victory with the only goal kicked by H. Barry who played excellently all afternoon.

The club's home ground was established in May 1875 west of and at the foot of Montefiore Hill, North Adelaide and was used until the end of the 1881 season.

At the 1875 annual dinner held at the Crown and Sceptre Hotel on Wednesday evening, 15 September the secretary, G. E. Downs reported that the club had only lost the opening match out of nine matches played, and that they had obtained 23 goals in these matches to four goals scored against them.

The Victorian Football Club captained by G. Downs was the first to play a game against the newly formed South Adelaide Football Club on 20 May 1876 at Montefiore Hill which started at 3pm. After some hard work and several disputes over the rules of the game, it ceased two hours later after the home team the Victorians scored a goal by H. Barry.

The Victorian club sent delegates and joined the newly formed SAFA on 30 April 1877 and were declared joint SAFA Premiers, together with South Adelaide, in the inaugural SAFA season of 1877.

One notable game that the Victorian Football Club played was the first intercolonial match involving a South Australian club. The game was held on 11 August 1877 on the Adelaide Exhibition Grounds against the Melbourne Football Club, with the visitors winning 1 goal to nil.

At the Annual General Meeting held on Friday 16 March 1883 at Scotch Thistle Hotel, North Adelaide, with 40 members present, the club resolved to change its name to North Adelaide Football Club.

Having struggled to compete in its later years following an exodus of players, the club disbanded at the end of the 1884 SAFA season, having finished last in each of the preceding two seasons. The club's last game was at Kensington Oval vs Norwood on 27 Sep 1884, which was a loss. Two weeks earlier, the "Tigers" had their only win of the season, an upset victory over Norwood who had been SAFA premiers for the last five seasons (by 4 goals 4 behinds to 2 goals 10 behinds).

Several of their players joined the Hotham Club for the 1885 season.

SAFA 1877-1884 Ladder Positions

Notable players

George Edward Downs was Captain of the Club and South Australia's First Captain. He also became a First Class Cricket Umpire and a Test Umpire for one test in 1892.

Frank Marlow was a player who became a long-serving administrator as secretary of South Adelaide Football Club and of the South Australian National Football League (SANFL); most likely his brother Alf Marlow as well; both transferred to South Adelaide after moving house to Gilles Street, Adelaide.

Honours
Interclub Competition (1): 1876
List of SANFL premiers (1): 1877, Inaugural SAFA Club Champion shared with South Adelaide

References

1874 establishments in Australia
1884 disestablishments in Australia
Australian rules football clubs in South Australia
Former South Australian National Football League clubs
Australian rules football clubs established in 1874
Australian rules football clubs disestablished in 1884